Józef Klukowski (born 5 February 1946) is a Polish former breaststroke swimmer. He competed in two events at the 1968 Summer Olympics.

References

External links
 

1946 births
Living people
Polish male breaststroke swimmers
Olympic swimmers of Poland
Swimmers at the 1968 Summer Olympics
Sportspeople from Gdańsk